The following lists events that happened during 1854 in Australia.

Incumbents

Governors
Governors of the Australian colonies:
Governor of New South Wales – Sir Charles Augustus FitzRoy
Governor of South Australia – Sir Henry Young (term ended 20 December)
Lieutenant-Governor of Van Diemen's Land – Sir William Denison
Lieutenant-Governor of Victoria – Charles La Trobe (until 5 May), then Sir Charles Hotham (from 22 June)
Governor of Western Australia as a Crown Colony – Captain Charles Fitzgerald

Events
This was a year of intense political agitation by miners on the Victorian goldfields.
 3 March – The first telegraph line in the southern hemisphere begins operating in Victoria.
 4 July – Anti-Chinese riots occur in Victoria.
 5 July – The Mercury was first published in Hobart.
 17 October – The Melbourne daily newspaper The Age was first published.
 29 November – The Eureka Flag was flown for the first time during the Eureka Stockade rebellion in Ballarat.
 3 December – battle suppressing the rebellion at Eureka Stockade

Exploration and settlement
4 January – Captain William McDonald aboard the Samarang discovers the McDonald Islands.
12 September – Lieutenant-Governor of Victoria Charles Hotham opens Flinders Street station, the first city railway station in Australia.

Sport
30 September – The first game of cricket is played at the Melbourne Cricket Ground.

Births
 12 February – Edward Wittenoom, Western Australian politician (d. 1936)
 24 March – Sir Henry Lefroy, 11th Premier of Western Australia (d. 1930)
 12 April – William Maloney, Victorian politician and doctor (d. 1940)
 20 May – George Prendergast, 28th Premier of Victoria (d. 1937)
 25 June – Andrew Lang Petrie, Queensland politician (d. 1928)
 5 August – William Aitcheson Haswell, zoologist (born in the United Kingdom) (d. 1925)
 18 October – Billy Murdoch, cricketer (d. 1911)
 30 November – James Wilkinson, Queensland politician (d. 1915)
 Unknown, possibly December – Ned Kelly, bushranger (d. 1880)

Deaths
 7 October – James Scobie, gold miner (born in the United Kingdom) (b. 1826)
 Unknown – Jackey Jackey (b. 1833)

References

 
Australia
Years of the 19th century in Australia